Neil McIntosh (born 1942) is a British and Scottish paediatrician  and  neonatologist who was most notable for being the leading writer of a pivotal article that defined standards of ethical behaviour in paediatrics, including withdrawal of newborn intensive care. McIntosh is emeritus professor of Neonatology and Child Life and Health at the University of Edinburgh. During McIntosh's career he has researched mineral metabolism in preterm infants, computerised acquisition of physiological data in Neonatal Intensive Care Nursing.

Life
McIntosh took his postgraduate clinical training in University College Hospital, London in 1968. Mcintosh was Senior Registrar in Paediatrics at University College Hospital, London, from 1972 to 1977. In 1978 McIntosh was appointed as a senior lecturer and consultant paediatric neonatologist at St George's Hospital, a position he held until 1987. In 1987 he was elected to the Edward Clarke Chair of Child Life and Health at the University of Edinburgh, a position McIntosh held until 2007.

Bibliography

Articles
Some of the most important papers that McIntosh co-wrote:

Books
In addition to collaborating in writing a large number of articles, McIntosh also wrote the following books:

References

1942 births
Living people
British paediatricians